The London county football team represents London in men's Gaelic football and is governed by London GAA, the county board of the Gaelic Athletic Association. The team competes in the three major annual inter-county competitions; the All-Ireland Senior Football Championship, the Connacht Senior Football Championship and the National Football League.

London's home ground is McGovern Park, South Ruislip, Oxley Park, Watford. The team's manager is Michael Maher.

London defeated Sligo to reach the Connacht Senior Championship final in 2013, but has never won the All-Ireland Senior Championship or the National League.

History
The team participated in the All-Ireland Senior Football Championship (SFC) between 1900 and 1910. Louth in 1913 Leinster Senior Football Championship.

London entered the National Football League in 1993 and was initially fairly successful with two wins, two draws and two losses in the county's first campaign. The renewed effort coincided with a drive to establish the games in schools. London now fields its second team in the British Junior Football and Hurling Championships.

London's first football team has competed in the Connacht Senior Football Championship (SFC) since 1975, but in the first 37 years of competing managed one win: a 0–9 to 0–6 defeat of Leitrim in 1977.

After losing by a scoreline of 9–19 to 1–10 against Roscommon in 1980, London staged matches at home in Ruislip and came close to victory against Leitrim in 1987, Sligo in 1988 and Roscommon in 2005. Among its footballers was Brian Grealish, whose brother Tony played association football for the Republic of Ireland national team. Due to the UK's foot-and-mouth outbreak, London withdrew from the 2001 Connacht SFC; the county's first round championship fixture against Mayo was cancelled until the 2006 fixture between the teams. In June 2011, Mayo defeated London after extra-time in the Connacht SFC, London entered the first qualifying round and defeated Fermanagh by a scoreline of 0–15 to 0–9 in Ruislip in the first round of the 2011 All-Ireland SFC qualifiers, recording its first championship win for 34 years. The team was then drawn against Waterford for its second round qualifying game.

In 2013, the GAA banned the county from travelling to Ireland for warm-up games, as a result of a GAA rule put in place to prevent Ireland-based teams travelling abroad for training camps in the run up to the championship, putting London at a major disadvantage to other counties. On 26 May 2013, London defeated Sligo by a scoreline of 1–12 to 0–14 to gain its first victory in the Connacht SFC since 1977. Lorcan Mulvey scored the vital London goal. The day after the team defeated Sligo was a bank holiday in England, so the players rested. London held Leitrim in the Connacht SFC semi-final then won the replay. After these three games the team headed for the Connacht SFC final — a first appearance at that level — but lost to Mayo. The team arrived in Ireland for the final on a specially charted jet. Thus did London enter Round 4 of the 2013 All-Ireland SFC qualifiers — also its first time to feature there. The team was paired with Cavan, a first championship meeting between the teams and the game was set for Croke Park, another historic occasion for London. Cavan won by a score of 1-17 to 1-08 to proceed to the All-Ireland quarter-finals. Lorcan Mulvey was later nominated for an All Star Award, but was not selected.

London fielded a  seven London-born starters its line-up for the county's 2018 Connacht SFC defeat to Sligo, 

London withdrew from the 2020 championship due to the impact of the COVID-19 pandemic on Gaelic games. London was excluded from the 2021 league and championship for the same reason.

London returned in 2022. The county won its opening three fixtures of the 2022 National Football League and topped Division 4 after those three wins, over Carlow, Waterford and Leitrim. The wins against Carlow and Leitrim were away from home. Then Leitrim narrowly defeated London in a 2022 Connacht SFC quarter-final at Ruislip, with London scoring two goals to go within a point of the visitors as the game neared its conclusion, and then Leitrim responded with a late goal to secure a four-point victory.

Current panel

INJ Player has had an injury which has affected recent involvement with the county team.
RET Player has since retired from the county team.
WD Player has since withdrawn from the county team due to a non-injury issue.

Current management team
Manager: Michael Maher 
Selectors: Chris Byrne, Joseph Coulter, Noel Dunning
Strength and Conditioning: Ross Bennett, Colm Smith
Performance Analyst: Shane Mangan

Managerial history
The following is a table of London's county football managers at senior level since 1990. In October 2019, London-born Michael Maher became the first native to take charge of the London county football team. Maher experienced success while managing London sides at youth level and was part of former manager Ciarán Deely's backroom team for 2019.

| * = Withdraw from later stages of the 2001 League season due to the UK's foot-in-mouth outbreak and championship. Withdrew again in 2020, fully on that occasion, and also did not play in 2021 due to the impact of the COVID-19 pandemic on Gaelic games.

Kit evolution
London released a new jersey ahead of the 2017 season.

London released home and away jerseys to commemorate its 125th anniversary in 2021. Inspired by the jersey worn in the 1901 All-Ireland Senior Hurling Championship Final (the county's only All-Ireland senior win), both jerseys featured a sash from the left hip to the right shoulder.

Colours

Honours
All-Ireland Senior Football Championship
 Runners-up (5): 1900, 1901, 1902, 1903, 1908
 Semi-finalists (3): 1906, 1907, 1910
All-Ireland Junior Football Championship
 Winners (6): 1938, 1966, 1969, 1970, 1971, 1986
Connacht Senior Football Championship
 Runners-up (1): 2013
McGrath Cup
 Winners (1): 1988

Notes
a.  London received a bye to the final in five seasons.

References

 
County football teams